Olivella miriadina is a species of small sea snail, marine gastropod mollusk in the subfamily Olivellinae, in the family Olividae, the olives.  Species in the genus Olivella are commonly called dwarf olives.

Description
The length of the shell attains 6 mm.

Distribution
This marine species occurs off Colombia; Venezuela and the Lesser Antilles.

References

External links
 MNHN, Paris: syntype

miriadina
Gastropods described in 1835